Travis Freeman Johnson (born June 28, 1991) is a retired American football outside linebacker. He played college football at San Jose State.

Early years
Born in San Jose, Johnson graduated from The King's Academy in nearby Sunnyvale, California in 2009 and is an Eagle Scout. He had 38 sacks in his final two seasons of high school.

College career
He played college football at San José State University. In his freshman season, he played in 12 games in which he made 18 tackles and two sacks. In his sophomore season, he played and started in all 13 games and recorded 62 tackles and 7.5 sacks.

In his junior season of 2011, he played and started in all 12 games in which he recorded 73 tackles and 9.5 sacks.  He was nominated to the Hendricks Award Watch List for the best defensive end. He was selected to the First-team All-WAC defensive lineman. In his senior season, 65 tackles, a career high 13 sacks, 3 forced fumbles, and 2 pass deflections. On October 14, 2011, in a 28-27 victory over Hawaii nationally televised on ESPN, Johnson blocked an extra point and a field goal by Hawaii. Duke Ihenacho returned the blocked extra point all the way to the Hawaii end zone for a two-point defensive conversion.

Johnson ended his senior year with multiple conference and national honors, including CBS Sports third-team All-American, Sports Illustrated honorable mention All-American, Western Athletic Conference (WAC) Defensive Player of the Year, first-team All-WAC, and second-team Academic All-American. He also won the National Football Foundation Scholar-Athlete Award after his senior season.  He finished his college career with a total of 218 Tackles, 32 Sacks, 3 Forced fumbles and 2 Pass deflections. He was invited and played in the 2013 East-West Shrine Game on the west team and the 2013 Senior Bowl. Johnson graduated from San Jose State in 2013 with a Bachelor of Science degree in kinesiology. Johnson is also a member of the Fellowship of Christian Athletes.

Professional career
Johnson was not selected in the 2013 NFL Draft. Following the draft, Johnson joined New York Jets rookie minicamp.

San Francisco 49ers
On July 30, 2013, the San Francisco 49ers signed linebacker Travis Johnson to a three-year deal. The 49ers waived Johnson on August 31, 2013. Johnson had 6 tackles and 1 sack during the preseason.

References

External links
San Jose State Spartans bio

1991 births
Living people
American football defensive ends
American football linebackers
Sportspeople from Sunnyvale, California
Players of American football from San Jose, California
San Jose State Spartans football players
San Francisco 49ers players